A priesthood blessing in the Church of Jesus Christ of Latter-day Saints (LDS Church) is a "prayer for healing, comfort or counsel given by a Melchizedek Priesthood holder, who lays his hands on the head of the person receiving the blessing." Priesthood blessings are considered to be non-saving ordinances by Latter-day Saints.

See also
 Laying on of hands
 Ordinance (Latter Day Saints)
 Patriarchal blessing

Notes

References
 
 
 

Latter Day Saint ordinances, rituals, and symbolism
Latter Day Saint terms
Supernatural healing